Tarun Cherian is an Indian poet. For his poem A Writer's Prayer, he won the Second Prize in the All India Poetry Competition in 1990 organized by The Poetry Society (India) in collaboration with British Council.

Biography
Tarun Cherian obtained his bachelor's degree in Economics from the St. Stephen's College and master's degree from the Delhi School of Economics.

Online references
  Past Life Regression and Holistic Healing by Tarun Cherian
Spiritual Artist Tarun Cherian – Alliance Francaise
  A Piece of Heaven – Tarun Cherian's Art Exhibition
  Cherian on Death and Rebirth

See also

 Tarun Cherian – A Biography
 Awaken the God Within – by Tarun Cherian
 Indian English Literature
 Indian Writing in English
 Indian poetry
 The Poetry Society (India)

Notes

Indian male poets
English-language poets from India
Living people
Malayali people
Year of birth missing (living people)
All India Poetry Prize